Castello Junior Lukeba, also known as Castello Jr. (born 17 December 2002) is a French professional footballer who plays as a centre-back for  club Lyon.

Club career 

Having joined Olympique Lyonnais's Academy in 2011, Lukeba signed his first professional contract with the club on 1 July 2021. He made his professional debut for Olympique Lyonnais on the 7 August 2021 as a starter against Stade Brestois 29 on 2021–22 Ligue 1 opening round. He played full 90 minutes during the match but it eventually ended in a 1–1 draw. Lukeba made his European football debut on 25 November 2021 on a 3–1 against Brøndby IF in 2021–22 UEFA Europa League group stage. He scored his first goal for the club on 22 December 2021 against FC Metz with a header, assisted by Rayan Cherki with a cross following a corner.

International career

Born in France, Lukeba is of Angolan descent. He decided to represent France at the international level and received his first call up in France U-21 in November 2021, where he joined his club mates Maxence Caqueret, Rayan Cherki and Malo Gusto

Career statistics

Club

References

External links
 Profile at the Olympique Lyonnais website
 
 
 

2002 births
Living people
Footballers from Lyon
French footballers
France under-21 international footballers
France youth international footballers
French people of Angolan descent
Association football defenders
Olympique Lyonnais players
Ligue 1 players
Championnat National 2 players